Anna Tarasova (born 23 March 1980) is a Kazakhstani athlete. She competed in the women's long jump and the women's triple jump at the 2000 Summer Olympics.

References

1980 births
Living people
Athletes (track and field) at the 2000 Summer Olympics
Kazakhstani female long jumpers
Kazakhstani female triple jumpers
Olympic athletes of Kazakhstan
Athletes (track and field) at the 1998 Asian Games
Sportspeople from Karaganda
Asian Games competitors for Kazakhstan